Elvesæter is a village in Lom Municipality in Innlandet county, Norway. The small village area lies in the Jotunheimen mountains, just north of Jotunheimen National Park.

The village is the site of a large hotel which was the site of the 12th World Scout Conference in 1949.

References

Lom, Norway
Villages in Innlandet